The 1972 Giro d'Italia was the 55th edition of the Giro d'Italia, one of cycling's Grand Tours. The field consisted of 100 riders, and 69 riders finished the race.

By rider

By nationality

References

1972 Giro d'Italia
1972